Zeuxippus is a Greek name that may refer to:

Ancient Greece-related (also Zeuxippos):
Zeuxippus (mythology), name of three minor figures in Greek mythology
Zeuxippus of Heraclea (5 c. BCE)
Zeuxippus of Boeotia, leader of a pro-Roman political party in the early 2 c. BCE
Zeuxippus, a Pyrrhonist philosopher mentioned in Diogenes Laërtius
Zeuxippus of Sparta, a friend of Plutarch
Baths of Zeuxippus, famous Roman baths in Constantinople
Biological nomenclature:
Zeuxippus, a spider genus of the family Salticidae
 Zeuxippus atellanus
 Zeuxippus histrio
 Zeuxippus pallidus
 Zeuxippus yunnanensis